Stockholm Globe City or Stockholm Globe Arenas is an area in Johanneshov, in Stockholm, Sweden. It contains a number of venues, office areas, and a shopping centre.

Venues

Avicii Arena represents the Sun in the Sweden Solar System.

External links

 Stockholm Globe City
 The Globe venues
 Sweden Solar System

Buildings and structures in Stockholm
Office buildings in Sweden